Robert, Rob, Robbie, Bob or Bobby Thomson may refer to:

 Bob Thomson (1890–1971), English footballer for Chelsea
 Bobby Thomson (1923–2010), Major League baseball player who hit "The Shot Heard Round the World"
 Bobby Thomson (footballer, born 1937), former Aston Villa and Birmingham City footballer
 Bobby Thomson (footballer, born 1939), Scottish footballer (Partick Thistle, Liverpool FC, Luton Town)
 Bobby Thomson (footballer, born 1943) (1943–2009), former England and Wolverhampton Wanderers footballer
 Bobby Thomson (footballer, born 1955), Scottish footballer (Hibernian, Blackpool FC)
 Rob Thomson (born 1963), third base coach for the New York Yankees
 Robbie Thomson (born 1993), Scottish footballer
 Robert Thomson (Australian politician) (1807–1863), member of the Victorian Legislative Council
 Robert Thomson (basketball) (born 1982), Rwandan basketball player
 Robert Thomson (cyclist), cyclist, yachter, and longboarder from New Zealand
 Robert Thomson (executive) (born 1961), Australian media executive (News Corp) and journalist
 Robert Thomson (footballer, born 1890) (1890–?), footballer for Huddersfield Town
 Robert Thomson (footballer, born 1903) (1903–?), Scottish footballer for Falkirk, Sunderland, Newcastle, Hull, Ipswich and Scotland
 Bertie Thomson (Robert Austin Thomson, 1907–1937), Scottish footballer for Celtic, Blackpool, Motherwell and Scotland
 Robert Thomson (footballer, born 1993), Scottish footballer
 Robert Thomson (physician) (1810–1864), Scottish physician, academic, and author
 Robert Stevenson Thomson (1858–1905), British physician
 Robert Tatlock Thomson (1856–1950),  British chemist and public analyst
 Robert W. Thomson (1934–2018), philologist
 Robert William Thomson (1822–1873), Scottish inventor
 Robert Thomson (golfer) (1875–1954), Scottish golfer
 Robert Thomson (British Army officer), British general

See also 
 Robert Thompson (disambiguation)
 Bobby Thompson (disambiguation)
 Bert Thomson (disambiguation)